Martin Finn (22 August 1917 – 7 March 1988) was an Irish Fine Gael politician, farmer and auctioneer. He was elected to Dáil Éireann for the Mayo East constituency at the 1969 general election and was re-elected at the 1973 general election. He lost his seat at the 1977 general election but was nominated by the Taoiseach Liam Cosgrave to the 13th Seanad.

References

1917 births
1988 deaths
Fine Gael TDs
Members of the 19th Dáil
Members of the 20th Dáil
Members of the 13th Seanad
Politicians from County Mayo
Irish farmers
Nominated members of Seanad Éireann
Fine Gael senators